State Route 206 (SR 206) is a state highway in the southeastern part of U.S. state of Georgia. It runs southeast–northwest through portions of Ben Hill, Irwin, and Coffee counties. The route's southern terminus is in Douglas, and its northern terminus is just east of Fitzgerald.

Route description
SR 206 begins at an intersection with US 221/US 441/SR 31/SR 135 in Douglas. It is part of a bypass around town. SR 135 and SR 206 run concurrent from SR 206's eastern terminus to a point approximately  farther to the west. At this intersection, SR 135 turns to the southwest on Willacoochee Highway, and SR 335 begins a concurrency to the northwest. Just before leaving town is an intersection with SR 32. Northwest of Douglas is SR 206 Connector. The highway continues to the northwest until it reaches its northern terminus, an intersection with US 319/SR 107 east of Fitzgerald.

SR 206 is not part of the National Highway System, a system of routes determined to be the most important for the nation's economy, mobility and defense.

Major intersections

Related route

State Route 206 Connector (SR 206 Connector) exists entirely within the southeastern part of Coffee County. It is located north of Douglas as a connector between the SR 206 northwest of Douglas and US 221/SR 135 northeast of town. It is a nearly west-east route.

SR 206 is not part of the National Highway System, a system of routes determined to be the most important for the nation's economy, mobility and defense.

See also

References

External links

 Georgia Roads (Routes 201 - 220)
 Georgia State Route 206 on State-Ends.com

206
Transportation in Coffee County, Georgia
Transportation in Irwin County, Georgia
Transportation in Ben Hill County, Georgia